A petrographic province is a geological region within which the igneous rocks reveal a relationship (so-called consanguinity) in chemical composition, which may be referred to a community of origin. This relationship may be chemically a close one, but the rocks have widely varying mineralogical composition, or the kinship may be restricted to one or more of the chemical components in the rocks.

Etymology

References
 

Petrology